A summit accordance (sometimes also known by the German loan word gipfelflur) exists when hills and mountaintops, and eventually also plateaux, have such a disposition that they form a geometric plane that may be either horizontal or tilted. Summit accordances can be the vestiges of former continuous erosion surfaces that were uplifted and eroded. Other proposed explanations include:
the possibility that erosion becomes more effective at height, tearing down mountains that stand out
that isostasy regulates the height of individual mountain masses meaning that small mountains might be uplifted and large mountains dragged down
that landscape dissection by uniformly spaced streams eventually reach a state in which summits attain similar heights 
that summit accordance is derivative of structural planes exposed by erosion

See also
Dissected plateau
Glacial buzzsaw
Syrt

References

Mountain geomorphology